Marinella (born 1938) is a popular Greek singer.

Marinella may also refer to:

 Three albums by Marinella:
 Marinella (1969 album)
 Marinella (1971 album)
 Marinella (1981 album)
 Marinella (film), a 1936 French comedy film
 Marinella (TV series), a 1999–2001 Philippine drama series
 E. Marinella, an Italian necktie company

People
 Lucrezia Marinella (1571–1653), Italian poet, author, and advocate of women's rights
 Marinella Bortoluzzi (born 1939), Italian high jumper
 Marinella Canclini (born 1974), Italian short-track speed skater
 Marinella Draghetti (born 1961), Italian basketball player
 Marinella Falca (born 1986), Italian gymnast
 Marinella Mazzanti, Italian inorganic chemist
 Marinella Panayiotou (born 1995), Cypriot footballer 
 Marinella Senatore (born 1977), Italian visual artist

Places
 Marinella di Selinunte, a frazione in Castelvetrano in Trapani Province, Sicily, Italy
 Santa Marinella, a comune (municipality) in the Province of Rome in the Italian region Lazio